Catovair was a regional airline based in Mauritius that offered flights to Mauritius, Reunion and Rodrigues island in Africa. Catovair had plans to buy an ATR 42

Catovair ceased its operation in 2008.

Fleet
The Catovair fleet included the following aircraft:
Saab 340

Sources

Defunct airlines of Mauritius
Airlines established in 2005
Airlines disestablished in 2008
2005 establishments in Mauritius